Şeyhler (literally "sheikhs" in Turkish) may refer to the following places in Turkey:

 Şeyhler, Aksaray, a village in the district of Aksaray, Aksaray Province
 Şeyhler, Akyurt, a neighborhood of the district of Akyurt, Ankara Province
 Şeyhler, Göynücek, a village in the district of Göynücek, Amasya Province
 Şeyhler, Kurucaşile, a village in the district of Kurucaşile, Bartın Province